Dean Prosser  may refer to:

 William Prosser (1898–1972), Dean of the College of Law at UC Berkeley from 1948 to 1961
 Dean T. Prosser (1917–2007), Republican member of the Wyoming House of Representatives